Enrique Castro González (23 September 1949 – 27 February 2018), known as Quini , was a Spanish footballer who played as a striker.

In a career totally connected with Sporting de Gijón and FC Barcelona, he was widely regarded as one of the country's best strikers, having won a total of seven Pichichi Trophy awards, five of those in La Liga.

A Spain international for 12 years, Quini represented the nation in two World Cups and one European Championship.

Club career
Born in Oviedo, Asturias, Quini joined local Real Oviedo's neighbours Sporting de Gijón in 1968, from amateurs CD Ensidesa. In his first season in La Liga, 1970–71, he scored 13 goals in 30 games and, the following nine years, only netted once in single digits and won three Pichichi, one in Segunda División; ironically, in the year in which he won his second, Sporting were relegated, the player's 21 goals being insufficient to avoid last place.

In summer 1980, Quini signed with FC Barcelona, who had already tried to sign the player after Sporting's relegation. In his first two years he totalled 47 league goals, good enough for two more individual accolades. He also helped the Catalans to the 1981 Copa del Rey, netting twice to put away his beloved Sporting in a 3–1 win in the final. Additionally, in the 1981–82 European Cup Winners' Cup, he helped Barça come from behind to beat Belgium's Standard Liège 2–1 as the decisive match was held at the Camp Nou.

In his final two years, Quini appeared infrequently with Barcelona (but scored the club's 3,000th goal in the league, in a home match against CD Castellón), and chose to retire in 1984 at age 35, even being awarded a testimonial; however, he reconsidered and eventually returned to former side Sporting for three more years in the top flight, being sparingly used. On 14 June 1987 he played his last match, against Barcelona, and he totalled 448 games and 219 goals in the first division alone (fifth all-time). 

Quini continued to serve Sporting in the following decades, in several directorial capacities.

Kidnapping
On 1 March 1981, after scoring twice for Barcelona in a 6–0 home victory over Hércules CF, Quini was kidnapped by two men at gunpoint, being forced into a van. After many developments and 25 days – during this time, Barcelona could only amass one draw in four games, eventually losing the title race – he was rescued unharmed, upon cooperation between the Spanish and Swiss law enforcement agencies.

It was subsequently speculated that Quini developed Stockholm syndrome, since he decided not to press charges against his kidnappers and never claimed his personal damages award of 5 million pesetas.

International career
Quini made his debut for Spain on 28 October 1970, in a friendly in Zaragoza with Greece: having played the second half, he scored in a 2–1 win.

With a total of 35 caps and eight goals, Quini participated in two FIFA World Cups, 1978 and 1982, as well as UEFA Euro 1980. He could only find the net once in all those competitions (at Euro '80), and the nation suffered a 1–2 loss against Belgium.

Personal life
Quini's younger brother, Jesús, was also a footballer. A goalkeeper, he too spent several years with Sporting.

In 2008, Quini overcame a throat cancer. On 29 April 2016, the Town Hall of Gijón named him adoptive son of the city.

Death
On 27 February 2018, Quini died at the age of 68 after suffering a heart attack. Just one day later, the City Council of Gijón agreed unanimously to rename El Molinón stadium as Estadio El Molinón-Enrique Castro "Quini" in his memory.

About 14,000 people attended Quini's funeral at his main club's homeground.

Career statistics

Club
Sources:

International goals
Sources:

Honours

Club
Sporting Gijón
Segunda División: 1969–70, 1976–77

Barcelona
Copa del Rey: 1980–81, 1982–83
Supercopa de España: 1983
Copa de la Liga: 1983
UEFA Cup Winners Cup: 1981–82

Individual
Don Balón Award – Best Spanish Player: 1978–79
Pichichi Trophy: 1973–74, 1975–76, 1979–80, 1980–81, 1981–82 (La Liga); 1969–70, 1976–77 (Segunda División)

See also
 List of FC Barcelona players (100+ appearances)
 List of La Liga players (400+ appearances)
 List of Sporting de Gijón players (100+ appearances)

Notes

References

External links

1949 births
2018 deaths
Spanish footballers
Footballers from Oviedo
Association football forwards
La Liga players
Segunda División players
Tercera División players
CD Ensidesa players
Sporting de Gijón players
FC Barcelona players
Spain youth international footballers
Spain under-23 international footballers
Spain amateur international footballers
Spain international footballers
1978 FIFA World Cup players
1982 FIFA World Cup players
UEFA Euro 1980 players
Pichichi Trophy winners